Heliconia is a genus of flowering plants in the monotypic family Heliconiaceae. Most of the ca 194 known species are native to the tropical Americas, but a few are indigenous to certain islands of the western Pacific and Maluku in Indonesia. Many species of Heliconia are found in the tropical forests of these regions. Most species are listed as either vulnerable or data deficient by the IUCN Red List of threatened species. Several species are widely cultivated as ornamentals, and a few are naturalized in Florida, Gambia, and Thailand.

Common names for the genus include lobster-claws, toucan beak, wild plantain, or false bird-of-paradise; the last term refers to their close similarity to the bird-of-paradise flowers in the Strelitzia genus. Collectively, these plants are also simply referred to as "heliconias".

Description
These herbaceous plants range from 0.5 to nearly 4.5 m (1.5–15 ft) tall, depending on the species.

Leaves 
The simple leaves of these plants are 15–300 cm (6 in–10 ft). They are characteristically long, oblong, alternate, or growing opposite one another on nonwoody petioles often longer than the leaf, often forming large clumps with age.  The leaves in different positions on the plant have a different absorption potential of sunlight for photosynthesis when exposed to different degrees of sunlight. They also look like lobster claws.

Flower 

Their flowers are produced on long, erect or drooping panicles, and consist of brightly colored, waxy bracts, with small true flowers peeping out from the bracts. The growth habit of heliconias is similar to Canna, Strelitzia, and bananas, to which they are related. The flowers can be hues of reds, oranges, yellows, and greens, and are subtended by brightly colored bracts.

The flowers' shape often limits pollination to a subset of the hummingbirds in the region. They also produce ample nectar that attract these birds.

Seeds 
Fruits are blue-purple when ripe and primarily bird dispersed. Studies of post-dispersal seed survival showed that seed size was not a determinant. The highest amount of seed predation came from mammals.

Taxonomy 
The generic name Heliconia was given by Carl Linnaeus in 1771 from the Greek word  Helikṓnios from  Helikṓn after Mount Helicon in Boeotia, central Greece.

Heliconia is the only genus in the monotypic family Heliconiaceae, but was formerly included in the family Musaceae, which includes the bananas (e.g.  Musa, Ensete and so on). However, the APG system of 1998, and its successor, the APG II system of 2003, confirm the Heliconiaceae as distinct and places them in the order Zingiberales, in the commelinid clade of monocots.

Species
Species accepted by Kew Botanic Gardens

Distribution and habitat 
Most of the 194 known species are native to the tropical Americas, but a few are indigenous to certain islands of the western Pacific and Maluku. Many species of Heliconia are found in the tropical forests of these regions. Several species are widely cultivated as ornamentals, and a few are naturalized in Florida, Gambia and Thailand.<ref name=

Ecology 

Heliconias are an important food source for forest hummingbirds, especially the hermits (Phathornithinae), some of which – such as the rufous-breasted hermit (Glaucis hirsuta) – also use the plant for nesting.  The Honduran white bat (Ectophylla alba) also lives in tents it makes from heliconia leaves.

Bats

Pollination 
Although Heliconia are almost exclusively pollinated by hummingbirds, some bat pollination has been found to occur. Heliconia solomonensis is pollinated by the macroglosine bat (Melonycteris woodfordi) in the Solomon Islands. Heliconia solomonensis has green inflorescences and flowers that open at night, which is typical of bat pollinated plants. The macroglosine bat is the only known nocturnal pollinator of Heliconia solomonensis.

Habitat 
Many bats use Heliconia leaves for shelter. The Honduran white bat, Ectohylla alba, utilizes five species of Heliconia to make diurnal tent-shaped roosts. The bat cuts the side veins of the leaf extending from the midrib, causing the leaf to fold like a tent. This structure provides the bat with shelter from rain, sun, and predators. In addition, the stems of the Heliconia leaves are not strong enough to carry the weight of typical bat predators, so shaking of the leaf alerts roosting bats to presence of predators. The bats Artibeus anderseni and A. phaeotis form tents from the leaves of Heliconia in the same manner as the Honduran white bat. The neotropical disk-winged bat, Thyroptera tricolor, has suction disks on the wrists which allow it to cling to the smooth surfaces of the Heliconia leaves. This bat roosts head-up in the rolled young leaves of Heliconia plants.

Insects

Heliconias provide shelter for a diverse range of insects within their young rolled leaves and water-filled floral bracts. Insects that inhabit the rolled leaves often feed upon the inner surfaces of the leaf, such as beetles of the family Chrysomelidae. In bracts containing small amounts of water, fly larvae and beetles are the dominant inhabitants. In bracts with greater quantities of water the typical inhabitants are mosquito larva. Insects living in the bracts often feed on the bract tissue, nectar of the flower, flower parts, other insects, microorganisms, or detritus in the water contained in the bract (Siefert 1982). Almost all species of Hispini beetles that use rolled leaves are obligate herbivores of plants of the order of Zingiberales, which includes Heliconia. These beetles live in and feed from the rolled leaf, the stems, the inflorescences, or the unfurled mature leaves of the Heliconia plant. In addition, these beetles deposit their eggs on the leaf surface, petioles of immature leaves, or in the bracts of the Heliconia.  Furthermore, some wasp species such as Polistes erythrocephalus build their nest on the protected underside of large leaves.

Hummingbirds
Hummingbirds are the main pollinators of heliconia flowers in many locations. The concurrent diversification of hummingbird-pollinated taxa in the order Zingiberales and the hummingbird family (Trochilidae: Phaethorninae) starting 18 million years ago supports the idea that these radiations have influenced one another through evolutionary time. At La Selva Research Station in Costa Rica, specific species of Heliconia were found to have specific hummingbird pollinators. These hummingbirds can be organized into two different groups: hermits and non-hermits. Hermits are the subfamily Phaethornithinae, consisting of the genera Anopetia, Eutoxeres, Glaucis, Phaethornis, Ramphodon, and Threnetes. Non-hermits are a catch-all group of other hummingbirds that often visit heliconias, comprising several clades (McGuire 2008). Hermits are generally traplining foragers; that is, individuals visit a repeated circuit of high-reward flowers instead of holding fixed territories Non-hermits are territorial over their Heliconia clumps, causing greater self-pollination. Hermits tend to have long curved bills while non-hermits tend to possess short straight bills, a morphological difference that likely spurred the divergence of these groups in the Miocene era. Characteristics of Heliconia flowers that select for either hermit or non-hermit pollinator specificity are degree of self-compatibility, flowering phenology, nectar production, color, and shape of flower. The hummingbird itself will choose the plants its feeds from on the basis of its beak shape, its perch on the plant, and its territory choice.

Hummingbird visits to the Heliconia flower do not affect its production of nectar. This may account for the flowers not having a consistent amount of nectar produced from flower to flower.

Different Heliconia species have different flowering seasons. This suggests that the species compete for pollinators. Many species of Heliconia, even the newly colonized species, are visited by many different pollinators.

Cultivation 

Several cultivars and hybrids have been selected for garden planting, including:
 H. psittacorum × H. spathocircinata, both species of South America, mainly Brazil
 H. × rauliniana = H. marginata (Venezuela) × H. bihai (Brazil)
 H. chartacea cv. 'Sexy Pink'

Most commonly grown landscape Heliconia species include H. augusta, H. bihai, H. brasiliensis, H. caribaea, H. latispatha, H. pendula, H. psittacorum, H. rostrata, H. schiediana, and H. wagneriana.

Uses 

Heliconias are grown for the florist's trade and as landscape plants. These plants do not grow well in cold, dry conditions. They are very drought intolerant, but can endure some soil flooding. Heliconias need an abundance of water, sunlight, and soils that are rich in humus in order to grow well. These flowers are grown in tropical regions all over the world as ornamental plants. The flower of H. psittacorum (parrot heliconia) is especially distinctive, its greenish-yellow flowers with black spots and red bracts reminiscent of the bright plumage of parrots.

Gallery

See also
 National Tropical Botanical Garden, designated a conservation center by the Heliconia Society International

References

Bibliography

External links

 Monocot families (USDA)
 links at CSDL
 Heliconia observations at iNaturalist

 
Zingiberales genera
Garden plants of Australasia
Garden plants of North America
Garden plants of South America